Cumhuriyet Football Field is a football stadium in Konya, Turkey.

Cumhuriyet Football Field is located in the Malazgirt neighborhood of  Selçuklu disyricy in Konya, TTurkey.The venue hosted the qualification matches of the football competitions at the 2021 Islamic Solidarity Games.

References

Football venues in Turkey
Sports venues in Konya
Buildings and structures in Konya
Selçuklu District
Sports venues completed in 2021